Jozef Záhorský (6 January 1929 in Bratislava – 2002) was a Slovak ice hockey player who competed for Czechoslovakia in the 1952 Winter Olympics.

References

External links
 
 

1929 births
2002 deaths
Slovak ice hockey goaltenders
Olympic ice hockey players of Czechoslovakia
Ice hockey players at the 1952 Winter Olympics
Ice hockey people from Bratislava
Czechoslovak ice hockey goaltenders